Šangaj can refer to:

 Šangaj, a neighborhood and local community of Novi Sad, Serbia.
 Šangaj (Zemun), a neighborhood of Batajnica, Serbia.
 The Serbo-Croatian transcription of Shanghai.